The Obelisk of Montecitorio, also known as Solare, is an ancient Egyptian, red granite obelisk of Psamtik II (595–589 BC) from Heliopolis. Brought to Rome with the Flaminio Obelisk in 10 BC by the Roman Emperor Augustus to be used as the gnomon of the Solarium Augusti, it is now in the Piazza Montecitorio.

History

First construction
The stone was quarried at Aswan and then transported to and erected at the sanctuary of Ra in Heliopolis during the reign of Psamtik II (595–589 BC). 

The hieroglyphic inscription on the sides reads 
The Golden Horus, beautifying the Two Lands, beloved of Atum, lord of Heliopolis; 
the King of Upper and Lower Egypt, Neferibre, beloved of Re-Harakhti;
the son of his own body, who seizes the White Crown and who unites the Double Crown, 
Psammetikos, beloved of the Souls of Heliopolis.

and the inscription on the Pyramidion reads
King of Upper and Lower Egypt, <good heart of Re> son of Re <Psamchek II>
life for ever and ever
give him all life and all health for ever Re Horachty great god lord of the sky
I gave thee all life and dominion, all health, and all joy for ever

Second construction

In 10 BCE, Emperor Augustus ordered this and the Flaminio Obelisk to be brought to Rome. It was erected as the gnomon of the Solarium Augusti, his giant sundial (or horologium) in the Campus Martius. Besides its function as a solar clock, the obelisk was oriented in such manner so as to cast its shadow on the nearby Ara Pacis on 23 September, Augustus's birthday, which coincided with the autumnal equinox. The reason for this orientation of the sunlight alludes to the peace that Augustus had always strived for by directing the light to the Ara Pacis, Pax the Roman goddess of peace is being highlighted. This orientation “sanctioned his divine right to rule” and “possibly his right to establish a dynasty.”

A detailed description that gives us the typology, appearance and formal operating procedure of this imposing solar meridian is supplied from Pliny the Elder (Naturalis historia 36, 71–72): "The one [obelisk] in the Campus was put to use in a remarkable way by divine Augustus so as to mark the sun’s shadow and thereby the lengths of days" 

The inscription written on two sides of the obelisk's base runs as follows:  

IMP. CAESAR DIVI F.

AVGVSTVS

PONTIFEX MAXIMVS

IMP. XII COS. XI TRIB. POT. XIV

AEGVPTO IN POTESTATEM

POPVLI ROMANI REDACTA

SOLI DONVM DEDIT

Translation: Imperator Caesar, son of the deified (Julius Caesar), Augustus, Supreme Pontiff, proclaimed Imperator twelve times, Consul eleven times, holding Tribunician Power fourteen times, having reduced Egypt into the sovereignty of the Roman people, gave this gift to the sun. 

However, according to Pliny, the original horologic stopped working 30 years after its construction (that is, by the 40s AD).

Later history

Augustus’s decision to erect the obelisks in Rome inspired future rulers of Rome to do the same. Some of these rulers that would follow suit are Hadrian and Domitian. Both of them would erect more obelisks throughout Rome, each one with a different meaning.

Between the 9th and 11th centuries, probably because of fire, earthquake (perhaps the earthquake of 849) or war (e.g. during the siege of Rome of 1084 by Robert Guiscard), the obelisk collapsed and then, progressively, became buried. Pope Sixtus V (1520–1590) made some attempts to repair and raise the obelisk, reassembling some pieces that had been found in 1502 in a cellar off the "Largo dell'Impresa", the present Piazza del Parlamento. After this fruitless attempt, some traces of the meridian were recovered during the pontificate of Benedict XIV in 1748, who found parts of it under the main entrance of Piazza del Parlamento 3, sited just as in Pliny's description. The obelisk and the meridian were not originally located in the position in which they were re-erected by the popes, but in the space behind the Curia innocenziana (now called Palazzo Montecitorio). Under the cellar of a stable on a street in the Campus Martius, a piece of the meridian was excavated, with the markings for various months in Greek letters set into the travertine slabs. Another fragment was hypothesized to be contained in the mosaic still visible in the foundation of the Church of San Lorenzo in Lucina.

From 1789 to 1792, Pope Pius VI carried out intensive works to repair the obelisk, which was later raised and restored as a sundial. The direction of the restoration work was entrusted to the architect Giovanni Antinori, who restored the obelisk using granite from the Column of Antoninus Pius.  This column's base, with its famous relief showing the Solar obelisk held as a symbol of the Campus Martius regio by a personification of the Campus, is still preserved in the Vatican Museums.

In the new layout of Piazza Montecitorio (inaugurated on 7 June 1998), a new meridian was traced on the pavement in honor of Augustus's meridian, pointing towards the main entrance of the palazzo. Unfortunately, the shadow of the obelisk does not point precisely in that direction, and its gnomonic function is definitively lost.

See also

List of obelisks in Rome
List of Egyptian obelisks

Notes

References
 Franco Zagari, Piazza Montecitorio. Progetto di riqualificazione ambientale 1996–1998, (Camera dei Deputati e Comune di Roma), Roma 1998.
 Model, diagrams, and photographs of the Obelisk of Montecitorio

External links

Buildings and structures completed in the 6th century BC
Buildings and structures completed in the 1st century BC
Montecitorio
Montecitorio
Relocated Egyptian obelisks
Montecitorio
Augustan building projects
Tourist attractions in Rome
Rome R. III Colonna